This is a list of books about nuclear issues. They are non-fiction books which relate to uranium mining, nuclear weapons and/or nuclear power.

The Algebra of Infinite Justice (2001)
American Prometheus: The Triumph and Tragedy of J. Robert Oppenheimer (2005)
The Angry Genie: One Man's Walk Through the Nuclear Age (1999)
The Atom Besieged: Extraparliamentary Dissent in France and Germany (1981)
Atomic Obsession: Nuclear Alarmism From Hiroshima to Al-Qaeda (2010)
The Bells of Nagasaki (1949)
Brighter than a Thousand Suns: A Personal History of the Atomic Scientists (1958)
Britain, Australia and the Bomb (2006)
Brittle Power: Energy Strategy for National Security (1982) 
Canada’s Deadly Secret: Saskatchewan Uranium and the Global Nuclear System (2007)
Carbon-Free and Nuclear-Free (2007)
Chernobyl: Consequences of the Catastrophe for People and the Environment (2009)
Chernobyl. Vengeance of peaceful atom. (2006)
The Cold and the Dark: The World after Nuclear War (1984)
Command and Control (book) (2013)
Confronting the Bomb: A Short History of the World Nuclear Disarmament Movement (2009)
Conservation Fallout: Nuclear Protest at Diablo Canyon (2006)
Contesting the Future of Nuclear Power (2011)
Critical Masses: Opposition to Nuclear Power in California, 1958–1978 (1998)
The Cult of the Atom: The Secret Papers of the Atomic Energy Commission (1982)
The Day of the Bomb (1961)
The Doomsday Machine: Confessions of a Nuclear War Planner (2017)
The Doomsday Machine: The High Price of Nuclear Energy, The World's Most Dangerous Fuel (2012)
Essence of Decision: Explaining the Cuban Missile Crisis (1971)
Explaining the Atom (1947)
Fallout: An American Nuclear Tragedy (2004)
Fallout Protection (1961)
The Fate of the Earth (1982)
The Four Faces of Nuclear Terrorism (2004)
The Fourth Protocol (1984)
Fukushima: Japan's Tsunami and the Inside Story of the Nuclear Meltdowns (2013)
Full Body Burden: Growing Up in the Nuclear Shadow of Rocky Flats (2012)
The Gift of Time: The Case for Abolishing Nuclear Weapons Now (1998)
Hiroshima (1946)
The Hundredth Monkey (1982)
In Mortal Hands: A Cautionary History of the Nuclear Age (2009)
The International Politics of Nuclear Waste (1991)
Joseph Rotblat: A Man of Conscience in the Nuclear Age (2009)
Killing Our Own: The Disaster of America’s Experience with Atomic Radiation (1982)
The Last Train From Hiroshima (2010)
The Lean Guide to Nuclear Energy: A Life-Cycle in Trouble (2007)
Licensed to Kill? The Nuclear Regulatory Commission and the Shoreham Power Plant (1997)
Life After Doomsday (1980)
Los Alamos Primer (1992)
The Making of the Atomic Bomb (1988)
Making a Real Killing: Rocky Flats and the Nuclear West (1999)
Maralinga: Australia’s Nuclear Waste Cover-up (2007)
Megawatts and Megatons (2001)
My Australian Story: Atomic Testing (2009)
The Navajo People and Uranium Mining (2006)
Non-Nuclear Futures: The Case for an Ethical Energy Strategy (1975)
Normal Accidents: Living with High-Risk Technologies (1984) 
Nuclear Implosions: The Rise and Fall of the Washington Public Power Supply System (2008)
Nuclear Nebraska: The Remarkable Story of the Little County That Couldn’t Be Bought (2007) 
Nuclear or Not? Does Nuclear Power Have a Place in a Sustainable Energy Future? (2007)
Nuclear Politics in America (1997)
Nuclear Power and the Environment (1976)
The Nuclear Power Controversy (1976)
Nuclear Power is Not the Answer (2006)
Nuclear Terrorism: The Ultimate Preventable Catastrophe (2004)
Nuclear War in the UK (2019)
Nuclear War Survival Skills (1979)
Nuclear Weapons: The Road to Zero (1998)
Nukespeak: Nuclear Language, Visions and Mindset (1982)
On Nuclear Terrorism (2007)
On Thermonuclear War (1960)
Our Friend the Atom (1957)
The People of Three Mile Island (1980) 
The Plutonium Files: America's Secret Medical Experiments in the Cold War (1999)
Plutopia (2013)
Power to Save the World: The Truth About Nuclear Energy (2007)
Protect and Survive (1980)
The Psychology of Nuclear Proliferation (2006)
Reaction Time: Climate Change and the Nuclear Option (2007)
Red Jihad (2012)
The Samson Option: Israel's Nuclear Arsenal and American Foreign Policy (1991) 
The Seventh Decade: The New Shape of Nuclear Danger (2007)
Smyth Report (1945)
The Strategy of Conflict (1960)
Survival Under Atomic Attack (1950)
Three Mile Island: Thirty Minutes to Meltdown (1982)
TORCH report (2006)
Trinity: A Graphic History of the First Atomic Bomb (2012)
The Truth About Chernobyl (1991)
U.S. Nuclear Weapons: The Secret History (1988)
The Unfinished Twentieth Century (2001)
Uranium Wars: The Scientific Rivalry that Created the Nuclear Age (2009)
Voices from Chernobyl: The Oral History of a Nuclear Disaster (2005)
We Almost Lost Detroit (1975)
What Will Work: Fighting Climate Change with Renewable Energy, Not Nuclear Power (2011)
When Technology Fails (1994)
World Nuclear Industry Status Report

See also 
Bulletin of the Atomic Scientists
List of articles associated with nuclear issues in California
List of books about energy issues
List of books about renewable energy
List of nuclear holocaust fiction
List of films about nuclear issues
List of songs about nuclear war and weapons
List of crimes involving radioactive substances
List of environmental books
Nuclear weapons in popular culture

References

External links
ALSOS Digital Library for Nuclear Issues 
Bibliography: The Atomic Bomb
Nuclear Reader

Nuclear history
 
books about nuclear issues
Lists of technical books
Bibliographies of industry
Nuclear weapons policy